Kaasik is an Estonian surname (meaning birch forest), and may refer to:
  (born 1934), estonian medical scientist, member of the Estonian Academy of Sciences.
 Hannes Kaasik (born 1978), a football referee
 Tanel Kaasik (born 1974), a recurve archer
 Tõnis Kaasik (born 1949), Estonian entrepreneur, fencer, environmentalist, conservationist, and politician
 Gert Kaasik, Estonian-born Finnish rapper and DJ

See also
Kaasiku (disambiguation), several villages in Estonia
Kasemets, Estonian surname also meaning birch forest

Estonian-language surnames